Kwai Boo is a 2015 Chinese animated science fiction comedy film directed by Yunfei Wang. The film was released on August 6, 2015.

Voice cast
Yunfei Wang
Ah-Gui
Tianxiang Yang
Shan Xin
Xiaoxi Tang
Guannan He
Tute Hameng
A Jie
Bao Mu Zhong Yang
Xiaoyu Liu

Reception
The film earned  at the Chinese box office.

References

External links

2010s science fiction comedy films
2015 animated films
2015 films
Animated comedy films
Chinese animated science fiction films
2015 comedy films